The Aab-e-Gum derailment occurred on 17 November 2015 at , Balochistan, Pakistan when the Jaffar Express passenger train derailed. Twenty people were killed and 96 were injured.

Accident
Four carriages were derailed. At least twenty people were killed and 96 were injured, including about a dozen with critical injuries, and 33 with serious injuries. Both train crew were amongst the victims. The seriously injured were airlifted to hospital in Quetta by Pakistan Army Mil Mi-17 helicopters.

Investigation
The cause of the accident is under investigation by Pakistan Railways. Officials have stated that the trains' brakes failed. A survivor of the accident alleged that the train was allowed to proceed with a known fault in its braking system.

References

Railway accidents in 2015
Derailments in Pakistan
2015 in Pakistan
History of Balochistan, Pakistan (1947–present)
Kachhi District
Accidents and incidents involving Pakistan Railways
Rail transport in Balochistan, Pakistan